Fedurniki is a western rural locality (a village) in Gorod Vyazniki, Vyaznikovsky District, Vladimir Oblast, Russia. The population was 21 as of 2010.

Geography 
Fedurniki is located 6 km southeast of Vyazniki (the district's administrative centre) by road. Pirovy-Gorodishchi is the nearest rural locality.

References 

Rural localities in Vyaznikovsky District